The IQA World Cup IV was the 2010 edition of the IQA World Cup (now the US Quidditch Cup), a quidditch club tournament then organized by the International Quidditch Association.

The tournament was hosted in New York City at DeWitt Clinton Park. It was the first year that the cup was hosted in outside Middlebury, Vermont.

The World Cup featured 46 teams and 757 players from Canada and the United States. The IQA set a record with 40 media outlets and 20,000 spectators attending the tournament all together.

On August 15, 2010, the IQA announced that New York University would be hosting the tournament, making it the first time the World Cup was played in a major city.

Bracket
Middlebury College won the bracket 100–50 against Tufts University.

References

US Quidditch Cup
2010 in sports in New York (state)
2010 in American sports
Sports competitions in New York (state)
November 2010 sports events in the United States